Platz der Republik (Republic Square) is a city square in Altona, Hamburg, Germany. In the center of the square, the fountain of Stuhlmannbrunnen is located.

Squares in Hamburg
Altona, Hamburg